Lutetia may refer to:
Lutetia, the Romano-Celtic settlement on the site of today's Paris
Paris, capital of France
Hôtel Lutetia, a hotel in Paris
Lučenec, in Slovakia, also Lutetia in Latin
21 Lutetia, an asteroid
Lutetia, a typeface by Jan van Krimpen
Lutetium(III) oxide, a chemical compound
A variant of the given name Letitia

See also